ISO 10628 Diagrams for the chemical and petrochemical industry specifies the classification, content, and representation of flow diagrams. It does not apply to electrical engineering diagrams. ISO 10628 consists of the following parts:
Part 1: Specification of Diagrams (ISO 10628-1:2014)
Part 2: Graphical Symbols (ISO 10628-2:2012)
This document supersedes ISO 10628:2000 and ISO 10628:1997.

History

General principles
common elements of flow charts consist of: 
Block diagrams
Process flow diagrams
Piping and instrumentation diagrams (P&ID)

Symbols

See also
Process flow diagram 
ISO 14617, Graphical symbols for diagrams
ISO 15519, Specification for diagrams for process industry

Notes and references

External links
 
 

 
10628